Deval Eminovski (born 15 October 1964) is a Swedish former footballer who played as a midfielder. He appeared 19 times for the Sweden U21 team.

References

Association football midfielders
Swedish footballers
Allsvenskan players
Malmö FF players
1964 births
Living people